Danila Andreyevich Medvedev (born  March 21, 1980 in Leningrad (now Saint Petersburg)) is a Russian futurologist and politician. Specialising in the science and future of Russia, Medvedev serves as a member of the coordination council of the Russian Transhumanistic Movement.

In May 2005 he helped found KrioRus, the first cryonics company outside of the United States. Since August 2008, he has worked as Chief Planning Officer and Vice-President of the Science for Life Extension Foundation, based in Moscow.

Education and career 
Medvedev graduated from the International Management Institute of St. Petersburg (IMISP) in 2000. The title of his master's thesis was "Methods of the account of conditions of financing at an estimation of investment projects". On 21 March 2007, he was one of a group of transhumanists who gave a presentation in the Duma titled "Influence of science on political situation in Russia. A view into the future", after an invitation by the Liberal Democratic Party of Russia.

Works
 Are We Living In Nick Bostrom's Speculation? (2003)
 The decisive role of science in the development of philosophical ideas in 21st century (2003)
 First Russian translation of Robert Ettinger. The Prospect of Immortality (Роберт Эттингер.Перспективы бессмертия.Москва, Изд. «Научный мир», 2003

References

External links
 
 Interview with Danila Medvedev by Sky News
 Blog
 Danila Medvedev, Accelerating Future People Database
 Danila Medvedev on frozen heads, multidimensional interfaces and the challenges of immortality

1980 births
Cryonicists
Futurologists
Life extensionists
Living people
Politicians from Saint Petersburg
Russian transhumanists